Chiara Margarita Cozzolani (27 November 1602 – ca. 1676–1678), was a Baroque music composer, singer and Benedictine nun. She spent her adult life cloistered in the convent of Santa Radegonda, Milan, where she served as prioress and abbess and stopped composing. More than a dozen cloistered women published sacred music in seventeenth-century Italy.

Life and career
The youngest daughter born into a wealthy merchant family in Milan, Italy, Margarita Cozzolani entered the convent and took her vows in 1620. She added "Chiara" as her religious name.

Her writings are very prolific, with some stylistic characteristics being the usage of sequences and switching modes. The duets and solos in her 1642 Concerti Sacri had followed suit in the Lombard style. Her four musical opere were published between 1640 and 1650, which is the date of her Vespers, perhaps her best-known single work. There is also a Paschal Mass. Her first publication, Primavera di fiori musicali, though it survived into the 20th Century, was lost in 1945.
In the convent of Santa Radegonda, the nuns sang during major religious feast days. This drew a great deal of attention from the outside world. As abbess of Santa Radegonda, Cozzolani defended the nuns' music, which came under attack from Archbishop Alfonso Litta, who wanted to reform the convent by limiting the nuns' practice of music and other contact with the outside world. The archbishop's qualms could not have been reassured by the ecstatic report of Filippo Picinelli, in Ateneo dei letterati milanesi (Milan, 1670) who found that "the nuns of Santa Radegonda of Milan are gifted with such rare and exquisite talents in music that they are acknowledged to be the best singers of Italy. They wear the Cassinese habits of St. Benedict, but they seem to any listener to be white and melodious swans, who fill hearts with wonder, and spirit away tongues in their praise. Among these sisters, Donna Chiara Margarita Cozzolani merits the highest praise, Chiara in name but even more so in merit, and Margarita for her unusual and excellent nobility of invention...".

Donna Chiara Margarita Cozzolani disappears from the convent's records after 1676. The first modern edition of her complete motets, for one to five voices and continuo, appeared in 1998.

Works 

 Primavera di fiori musicali, for 1–4 voices and continuo, op. 1 (Milan 1640) (lost)
 Concerti sacri, for 2–4 voices and continuo, op. 2 (Venice 1642)
 Scherzi di sacra melodia, for 1 voice and continuo op. 3 (Venice 1648) (continuo lost)
 Salmi à otto... motetti ei dialoghi, for 2–8 voices and continuo, op. 3 [sic] (Venice 1650)
 O dulcis Jesu, for 2 voices (soprano or tenor) and continuo
 No, no no che mare, aria (lost)
 Venite gentes, for voice and continuo (lost)

References

External links
The Cozzolani Project

Chiara Margarita Cozzolani at hoasm.org
Deborah Roberts on Italian 17th-century cloistered musicians and composers

Further reading
The Sounds of Milan, 1585–1650, by Robert L. Kendrick. (Oxford University Press, USA (21 November 2002)
Celestial Sirens: Nuns and Their Music in Early Modern Milan by Robert L. Kendrick. (Oxford Monographs on Music, 1996)

1602 births
1670s deaths
Year of death uncertain
17th-century Italian composers
17th-century women composers
17th-century Italian Roman Catholic religious sisters and nuns
Italian Baroque composers
Italian women classical composers
Italian Roman Catholic abbesses
Benedictine nuns
Musicians from Milan